Denys Yermylovych Kulakov (born 1 May 1986) is a Ukrainian professional footballer who plays as a right-back. He plays for Russian club Ural Yekaterinburg.

Club career
On 2 February 2022, Kulakov extended his contract with Ural Yekaterinburg to June 2023. On 15 March 2022, Kulakov's contract with Ural was suspended until 30 June 2022 due to the 2022 Russian invasion of Ukraine.

Career statistics

Club

Notes

References

External links

 
 Profile on Football Squads

1986 births
People from Izium
Sportspeople from Kharkiv Oblast
Living people
Ukrainian footballers
Association football midfielders
Ukraine youth international footballers
Ukraine under-21 international footballers
Ukraine international footballers
FC Shakhtar-3 Donetsk players
FC Shakhtar-2 Donetsk players
FC Shakhtar Donetsk players
FC Vorskla Poltava players
FC Mariupol players
FC Dnipro players
FC Metalist Kharkiv players
FC Ural Yekaterinburg players
Ukrainian Second League players
Ukrainian First League players
Ukrainian Premier League players
Russian Premier League players
Ukrainian expatriate footballers
Expatriate footballers in Russia
Ukrainian expatriate sportspeople in Russia